In Greek mythology, Chelidon is a minor figure, a noblewoman from either the city of Miletus or Colophon in an Anatolian variant of the story of Philomela.

Family 
Chelidon was the daughter of Pandareus and his wife, and thus sister to Aëdon, Cleodora (or Cleothera), Merope (according to Pausanias, the last two were called Cameiro and Clytia) and an unnamed brother.

Mythology 
After her sister Aëdon won a bet against her husband Polytechnus, Polytechnus was forced to find his wife a slave. He went to Pandareus, claiming that Aëdon wanted to see her sister. Chelidon left with Polytechnus, but he forced himself on her, cut her hair short, and dressed her up as a slave, terrorizing her against telling anyone what had happened. He then gave her to Aëdon as a slave. Aëdon did not suspect anything until one day she overheard Chelidon lamenting her cruel fate. The two sisters then killed Itys, Aëdon and Polytechnus's son, and fed him to his father while they ran back to their own. Polytechnus hunted them down, but Pandareus protected his daughters and had Polytechnus tied up, smeared with honey and left to the mercy of flocks of flies. But Aëdon, feeling sorry for her husband, kept the flies off of him. Pandareus, his wife and the unnamed son attacked her, so Zeus decided to turn them all into birds. Chelidon became a swallow.

See also 

 Antiope 
 Io
 Nyctaea

References

Bibliography 
 Antoninus Liberalis, The Metamorphoses of Antoninus Liberalis translated by Francis Celoria (Routledge 1992). Online version at the Topos Text Project.
 Bell, Robert E., Women of Classical Mythology: A Biographical Dictionary. ABC-Clio. 1991. .
 
 Homer, The Odyssey with an English Translation by A.T. Murray, PH.D. in two volumes. Cambridge, MA., Harvard University Press; London, William Heinemann, Ltd. 1919. . Online version at the Perseus Digital Library. Greek text available from the same website.
 Homer. The Odyssey, Book XIX, in The Iliad & The Odyssey. Trans. Samuel Butler. pp. 676–7. 
 Pausanias, Description of Greece with an English Translation by W.H.S. Jones, Litt.D., and H.A. Ormerod, M.A., in 4 Volumes. Cambridge, MA, Harvard University Press; London, William Heinemann Ltd. 1918. . Online version at the Perseus Digital Library
 Pausanias, Graeciae Descriptio. 3 vols. Leipzig, Teubner. 1903.  Greek text available at the Perseus Digital Library.
 William Smith, Dictionary of Greek and Roman Biography and Mythology, v. 3, page 109

Anatolian characters in Greek mythology
Metamorphoses into birds in Greek mythology
Deeds of Zeus
Mythological rape victims